Maskall is a settlement located in the nation of Belize. It is a mainland village located in Belize District. It is 39 miles north of Belize City.

Populated places in Belize District
Belize Rural North